Ust-Aleyka is a rural locality (a selo) and the administrative center of Ust-Aleysky Selsoviet of Kalmansky District, Altai Krai, Russia. The population was 532 as of 2016. There are 5 streets.

Geography 
Ust-Aleyka is located 10 km south of Kalmanka (the district's administrative centre) by road. Nagorny is the nearest rural locality.

References 

Rural localities in Kalmansky District